Brusartsi Municipality is a small municipality (obshtina) in Montana Province, Northwestern Bulgaria, located in the Danubian Plain about 6 km south of Danube river. It is named after its administrative centre - the town of Brusartsi.

The municipality embraces a territory of 194.55 km2 with a population of 4,954 inhabitants, as of February 2011.

The area contains the Smirnenski Reservoir.

Settlements 

Brusartsi Municipality includes the following 10 places (towns are shown in bold):

Demography 
The following table shows the change of the population during the last four decades.

Religion 
According to the latest Bulgarian census of 2011, the religious composition, among those who answered the optional question on religious identification, was the following:

See also
Provinces of Bulgaria
Municipalities of Bulgaria
List of cities and towns in Bulgaria

References

External links
 Official website 

Municipalities in Montana Province